The Gremlin Special was a Douglas C-47 Skytrain that crashed during a sightseeing flight over the Baliem Valley (also known as Shangri-La valley) in New Guinea in the eastern part of Netherlands Indies in 1945. The recovery of the three survivors from an isolated valley surrounded by mountains, enemy troops, and native inhabitants made worldwide news at the time and is the subject of the 2011 book Lost in Shangri-La by author Mitchell Zuckoff.

Accident
The Gremlin Special flew into the side of a mountain on May 13, 1945. Five passengers survived the initial wreck with two, Sergeant Laura Besley and Private Eleanor Hanna, succumbing to injuries the next day. The survivors were Corporal Margaret Hastings, Sergeant Kenneth Decker and Lieutenant John McCollom.

The Baliem Valley was previously explored in 1938 by Richard Archbold, flying in a PBY-2. Although the press believed the survivors of the Gremlin Special crash to be the first outsiders to encounter the Dani people who inhabited the area, Archbold had sent two exploration teams into the valley in 1938.

Rescue

Search aircraft were dispatched when the Gremlin Special never returned. Three survivors were spotted on the ground during an air search on May 17. Two medical paratroopers were deployed to the site, followed by 10 other support troops. A journalist, Alexander Cann, was dropped into the site to document the rescue attempt, and the interactions with the native people.

The high-altitude rescue was performed using Waco CG-4 gliders towed by a Douglas C-47 Skytrain. Three separate rescues were performed by towing a glider with single pilot into the valley. The glider was then loaded and configured for a  live capture by the tow plane which recovered the survivors, towing them back to a base in Hollandia.

Aircraft
The "Gremlin Special"  was a Douglas C-47 Skytrain
A Waco CG-4 was used in the rescue attempt. The first glider sustained damage from low flight over trees and a whipping parachute that was snagged on takeoff. A second CG-4 was used for the remaining two rescues.

External Links
Alexander Cann's video of the rescue "RESCUE FROM SHANGRI-LA" 1945 C-47 PLANE CRASH SURVIVOR DOCUMENTARY

References

Bibliography

Aviation accidents and incidents in 1945
History of New Guinea
1945 in Oceania
1945 in Papua New Guinea
Aviation accidents and incidents in Papua New Guinea
1945 disasters in Papua New Guinea